Varesina, meaning from or relating to Varese, may refer to:

 The Carrozzeria Varesina, an Italian coachbuilder
 The Quartiere Varesina of Milan
 The Società Varesina per le Imprese Elettriche, a railway company
 The Varesina (sheep) breed of sheep